Parishing is a small village. It lies South of Astore, northern areas, Gilgit, Pakistan. Parishing means the farthest mountain range.

Populated places in Astore District